Oi! Oi! That's Yer Lot! is a 1982 Oi! compilation album, featuring various artists and released by Secret Records. It is also known as Oi/4.

Compiled by Garry Bushell, the album was the sequel to Oi! The Album (1980), Strength Thru Oi! (Oi 2, 1981) and Carry On Oi! (Oi 3!, 1981).  The title derives from the catchphrase of comedian Jimmy Wheeler.

Track listing
 "Real Enemy" - The Business    
 "Dr Crippens" - Five 0
 "White Flag" - The Oppressed
 "Stick Together" - Sub-Culture
 "Liddle Towers" - Crux
 "Horror Show" - The Warriors
 "Big Brother" - Attak
 "Revenge" - Black Flag
 "Arthur's Theme" - Arthur and the Afters
 "On Yer Bike" - Frankie and the Flames
 "Getting Pissed" - The Magnificent Gonads
 "Willie Whitelaws Willie" - Attila the Stockbroker
 "The Belle of Snodland Town" - Judge Dread
 "Oi Oi Music" - Skin Graft
 "Away Day" - Attila the Stockbroker
 "Such Fun" - Coming Blood

See also
Oi! The Album
Carry On Oi!
Strength Thru Oi!
Son of Oi!

References

1982 compilation albums
Punk rock compilation albums
Oi! albums